Ravni may refer to:

Ravni, Mostar, a village in Bosnia and Herzegovina
Ravni (Brus), a village in the Brus municipality, Serbia
Ravni (Užice), a village in the Užice municipality, Serbia
Ravni, Slovenia, a settlement in the Krško municipality in eastern Slovenia
Ravni, Montenegro, village, Kolašin Municipality near Morača in Montenegro